Made en Drimmelen was a municipality in the Dutch province of North Brabant. It included the villages Drimmelen and Made.

The municipality existed until 1997, when it merged with Hooge en Lage Zwaluwe and Terheijde, to form the new municipality "Made".

References

Municipalities of the Netherlands disestablished in 1997
Former municipalities of North Brabant
Drimmelen